Karl Davies (born 6 August 1982) is an English actor, and voice actor, who portrayed Lyle Anderson in the TV series Kingdom. Previously he had portrayed Robert Sugden in the ITV soap opera Emmerdale.

Career
Davies took over the role of Robert Sugden in the soap opera Emmerdale in August 2001. The change in actor allowed the character to be developed and he soon became involved in a number of controversial storylines, most involving a long running feud with his adoptive brother Andy Sugden. He also became known for a number of romantic storylines, with Robert having an increasing number of sexual partners including Donna Windsor, Andy's wife Katie Sugden and 15-year-old Debbie Dingle, the mother of Andy's daughter.

As one of the young male characters in the show he was invited to take part in a soap calendar for Now Magazine in 2004 alongside fellow actors Ben Freeman and Kelvin Fletcher. The character's final romantic storyline involved an affair with the married Sadie King, played by Patsy Kensit. This storyline received media attention when Kensit reportedly objected to a relationship with a younger actor. Kensit however clarified the reasons for this in an interview with Leeds Today News stating "When I first heard about the storyline, I said 'but he looks like one of James's friends, so boyish and young'. But Karl is so adorable and we had a lot of fun filming those scenes". The brotherly feud which dominated much of Davies' time on the show was used by producers as the vehicle for a high-profile attempt to compete with rival soap EastEnders in the television ratings war and to secure Emmerdale'''s place as the second most popular soap opera in the UK. The chosen storyline involved Andy's attempts to kill Robert which led to his father, Jack Sugden(Clive Hornby) being shot. The story was to prove a success securing viewing figures of 7.6 million compared with 6.4 million for EastEnders. This was the first time Emmerdale has secured such a ratings victory.

For his final and highly publicised storyline it was made clear to the media weeks in advance that either Robert, Andy or local vet Max King would be killed in an explosive road accident. It was Max who died when Robert drove his car at him and Andy; he then fled the village to avoid being apprehended.

Along with the production of Dolphins, Davies also spent 2006 filming an ITV television series, Kingdom, opposite Stephen Fry, Celia Imrie, Hermione Norris and Tony Slattery. It followed the story of a solicitor (Fry) living in a quiet seaside village in Norfolk. Davies played a trainee solicitor Lyle Anderson, who dreams of escaping Market Shipborough, where the show is set, to work in the city. The first series aired in 2007 and the second began in January 2008.

In 2010, Davies played multiple characters on stage in the Tricycle Theatre's The Great Game: Afghanistan. The play consisted of 12 separate one-act plays (each by a different author) about Afghanistan. The production's tour includes stops in California, Minnesota, New York, and Washington, D.C. Davies appears in four segments, frequently as a soldier. In 2011 Davies was cast in the second series of the fantasy epic Game of Thrones as Alton Lannister. The following year he was cast in the second series of the BBC1 drama series The Syndicate.

In 2014 Davies appeared in two episodes of the drama series The Crimson Field, set in a field hospital during World War I. His character, Corporal Lawrence Prentiss, begins to suffer from combat fatigue and shell shock, and by the time of his second appearance is "completely psychologically damaged" by his experience of war. In preparation for the role, Davies watched surviving footage of shell-shock sufferers from the first world war, and was shocked by the extent of their condition. Also that year, Davies filmed a minor role in the disaster film Black Sea, in which his character dismisses the protagonist Captain Robinson (Jude Law) from his job. In April 2014 he began appearing in the crime thriller Happy Valley as Daniel Cawood. He returned for a second series of the drama in 2016.

Personal life
Prior to becoming a professional actor Davies enjoyed extreme sports and competed in climbing competitions at the age of 14, 15 and 16 but never pursued this further than local competitions at a junior level. He has expressed a love of extreme sports such as snowboarding and skiing. During his time on Emmerdale he has publicly stated that he was prevented from participating in these activities by the producers. His only real exception to this was as part of the annual charity fund-raising event in Inverurie where he was allowed to go wing walking on a biplane, an experience he greatly enjoyed.

Davies has revealed that his role in Emmerdale'' has led to much greater public recognition and that the reaction from fans of the show has been mixed. He has been insulted and slapped in the street by strangers who have been unable to tell him from the character he plays. Simultaneously, he has developed a following amongst gay viewers and received a lot of fan mail from male viewers.

Selected filmography

Film

Television

References

External links 
 

English male soap opera actors
English male radio actors
English male stage actors
English male film actors
Actors from Stockport
1982 births
Living people
People educated at Marple Hall School